Ŏryong station is a railway station in Kujang county, North P'yŏngan province, North Korea on the Manp'o Line of the Korean State Railway; it is also the starting point of the Ryongmun Colliery Line to Ryongmun T'an'gwang.

History
Ŏryong station on the Manp'o Line was opened on 1 May 1941.

References

Railway stations in North Korea